Dakar Université Club Basketball, also known simply as DUC or DUC Dakar, is a Senegalese basketball club based in Dakar. It is the basketball team of the Cheikh Anta Diop University. The team plays in the Nationale 1 and has won the league five times, its last being in 2021. Established in 1956, the team was founded as a basketball club and later became a multisports club, including football, athletics and more.

DUC plays in the Basketball Africa League (BAL) in the 2022 season, having qualified as national champions.

History
On 9 August 2021, DUC Dakar won its fifth national championship after defeating defending champions AS Douanes in the final. Thierno Niang was named the league's Finals MVP. As a result, the team qualified for the 2022 season of the Basketball Africa League (BAL).

Honours
Total: 17

Leagues 
Nationale 1
Winners (5): 2009, 2010, 2013, 2015, 2021
Runners-up (3): 1991, 1993, 2012

Cups 
Senegalese Cup
Winners (2): 2015, 2022
Saint Michel Cup
Winners (7): 2009, 2010, 2012, 2013, 2014, 2015, 2017
Dakar Municipal Cup
Winners (3): 2008, 2015, 2022

Season by season

Players

Current roster

Individual awards 
Nationale 1 MVP

 Thierno Niang – 2021

Senegalese Cup Final MVP

 Adama Diakhite – 2022

Notable players

Men's team
 Bara Diop
 El Hadji Ndiaye
 Thierno Niang

Women's team
 Kadidia Maiga
 Ndéye Séne

References

Basketball teams in Senegal
Sport in Dakar
Basketball teams established in 1956